The Herero Wars were a series of colonial wars between the German Empire and the Herero people of German South West Africa (present-day Namibia). They took place between 1904 and 1908.

Background

Pre-colonial South-West Africa
The Hereros were cattle grazers, occupying most of central and northern South West Africa. Under the leadership of Jonker Afrikaner, who died in 1861, and then later under the leadership of Samuel Maharero, they had achieved supremacy over the Nama and Orlam peoples in a series of conflicts that had in their later stages, seen the extensive use of fire-arms obtained from European traders.

German colonization
In the early 1880s, the German statesman Otto von Bismarck, reversing his previous rejection of colonial acquisitions, decided on a policy of imperial expansion. In 1882 Bismarck gave permission to Adolf Lüderitz to obtain lands which Germany would bring within its "protection", under the conditions that a port was established within the territories taken and that there was "clear title" to the land. Lüderitz bought the title to Angra Pequena (later renamed Lüderitz Bay) from Joseph Fredericks, a chief of the Oorlam people, in exchange for 200 rifles, 2,500 German marks, and some lead toy soldiers, and established a port there.  Clarification of Germany's title among the European powers took some time, as the British demurred in response to a German request to clarify the boundaries of their title, however in April 1884 Bismarck instructed the German consul in declare "Lüderitzland" (as Lüderitz's holding in South-West Africa had become known) as under the "protection" of the German Reich. Lüderitz steadily spread Germany's influence throughout the South-West African territory until by 1885 only one tribe within it – the Witboois – had not concluded some kind of arrangement with Germany.

Whilst Rhenish missionaries, traders, and other Europeans had been present in the territory since the 1830s, it was only with the advent of Germany's claim to South-West Africa that German settlement of the territory began in earnest. By 1903 there were roughly 4,682 European settlers in the protectorate of whom nearly 3,000 were Germans, most of them in the towns of Lüderitz, Swakopmund, and Windhoek. The advent of large-scale German settlement also brought about changes in the treatment of the native Herero and Nama peoples by Europeans, with native people facing increased legal discrimination and expropriation of land for the use of European settlers.

Rebellion
In 1903, some of the Khoi and Herero tribes rose in revolt and about 120-150 German settlers were killed, with many victims of the uprising tortured and mutilated before death. Troops were sent from Germany to re-establish order but only dispersed the rebels, led by Chief Samuel Maharero. In a famous letter to Hendrik Witbooi, the Namaqua chief, Maharero sought to organize his rebellion against the Germans while building alliances with the other tribes, exclaiming Let us die fighting!
The Herero led a guerrilla campaign, conducting fast hit and run operations then melting back into the terrain they knew well, preventing the Germans from gaining an advantage with their modern artillery and machine-guns. However a conclusive battle was fought on 11 August 1904, at the Battle of Waterberg in the Waterberg Mountains. Chief Maharero believed his six to one advantage over the Germans would allow him to win in a final showdown. The Germans had time to bring forward their artillery and heavy weapons. Both sides took heavy losses, but the Herero were scattered and defeated.

In October 1904, General Lothar von Trotha issued orders to kill every male Herero and drive women and children into the desert. As soon as the news of this order reached Germany, it was repealed, but Trotha initially ignored Berlin. When the extermination order was finally suspended at the end of 1904, surviving tribesmen were herded into concentration camps, while others were transferred as slave labor to German businesses; many Herero died of overwork and malnutrition.

It took the Germans until 1908 to re-establish authority over the territory. By that time tens of thousands of Africans estimates range from 34,000 to 110,000 had been either killed) or died of thirst while fleeing. 65,000 of 80,000 Hereros and at least 10,000 of 20,000 Nama died as a result of the conflict.

At the height of the campaign, some 19,000 German troops were involved.

At about the same time, diamonds were discovered in the territory, which briefly greatly boosted its prosperity.

Aftermath
In 1915, during World War I, South African forces occupied it in the so-called South West Africa Campaign, and SW Africa officially became a mandate of South Africa in 1920.

On 16 August 2004, 100 years after the war, the German government officially apologised for the atrocities. "We Germans accept our historic and moral responsibility and the guilt incurred by Germans at that time," said Heidemarie Wieczorek-Zeul, Germany's development aid minister. In addition, she admitted that the massacres were equivalent to genocide.

Not until 2015 did the German government admit that the massacres were equivalent to genocide and again apologised in 2016. The Herero are suing the German government in a class action lawsuit. In 2021, Germany announced that they would repay Namibia €1.1 billion.

In literature
The Herero Wars and the massacres are both depicted in a chapter of the 1963 novel V. by Thomas Pynchon. The tragic story of the Herero and Namaqua Genocide also appears in Pynchon's 1973 novel Gravity's Rainbow.

The heavy toll of the Herero and Namaqua Genocide on individual lives and the fabric of Herero culture is seen in the 2013 historical novel Mama Namibia by Mari Serebrov.

The war and the massacres are both significantly featured in The Glamour of Prospecting, a contemporary account by Frederick Cornell of his attempts to prospect for diamonds in the region. In the book, he describes his first-hand accounts of witnessing the concentration camp on Shark Island amongst other aspects of the conflict.

See also
 Herero and Namaqua genocide

References

Further reading 
 
 

 
German colonisation in Africa
Guerrilla wars
History of Namibia
Conflicts involving the German Empire
Imperialism
Conflicts in 1904
Conflicts in 1905
Conflicts in 1906
Conflicts in 1907
Conflicts in 1908
1900s in German South West Africa
African resistance to colonialism